Baksho Rahashya is a 1996 Bengali mystery-thriller film directed by Sandip Ray and based on the story of the same name by Satyajit Ray. It was the first telefilm made for Feluda 30, the TV film series, which aired on DD Bangla. Later it was released at Nandan Complex and the DVD and VCD were released in 2001. The film is the sequel to Joy Baba Felunath (1979).

Plot
Feluda is approached by an established businessman who claims to have mistakenly swapped his suitcase (baksho) in a train with one belonging to one of his co-passengers and now wants Feluda to put it straight. This simple looking problem lands Feluda, Topshe and Lalmohon Ganguly in Shimla, and into a realm of deceit and mystery involving a long forgotten diamond and a priceless manuscript,A Bengalee in Lamaland. Besides the trio, there is Dinanath Lahiri, the rich kind-hearted businessman, his nephew, Prabeer Lahiri who is a striving actor but too much obsessed with his only weakness, his voice. The other three characters in this story are the ones who were with Dinanath Lahiri in his first class compartment: Mr.Pakrashi who is a manuscript collector, Mr. Brijmohan and Mr. Dhameeja who got his suitcase exchanged with Mr. Lahiri. Feluda's investigations finally put the wrong-doers behind bars.

Cast
 Sabyasachi Chakrabarty as Feluda
 Saswata Chatterjee as Topshe
 Rabi Ghosh as Lalmohan "Jatayu" Ganguly
 Haradhan Bandopadhyay as Dinanath Lahiri
 Ajit Bandopadhyay as Sidhu Jyatha
Pradip Mukherjee as Prabir Lahiri
 Dibya Bhattacharya as Naresh Chandra Pakrashi
 Rajaram Yagnik as G.C.Dhameeja

See also
 Feluda in film
 Soumitra Chatterjee

References

External links
 Feluda: A genre, an escape and a philosophy
 

1996 films
Bengali-language Indian films
Indian children's films
Indian detective films
Films based on Indian novels
Films with screenplays by Satyajit Ray
Doordarshan television films
Action television films
Thriller television films
1990s Bengali-language films
Films directed by Sandip Ray